Gulland is a surname. Notable people with the surname include:

John Gulland (1864–1920), British politician
John A. Gulland (1923–1990), British fisheries scientist
John Masson Gulland (1898-1947) Scottish biochemist
Robin Milner-Gulland (born 1936), British scholar
Sandra Gulland (born 1944), American-born Canadian writer
Elizabeth Gulland (1857-1934), British artist

See also
HMT Gulland (T239), Isles-class trawler of the Royal Navy
Gulland - an old name for the Swedish island of Gotland when it was under Danish rule. See :da:Gotland